The Springfield to Fayetteville Road-Elkhorn Tavern Segment is a section of historic 19th-century roadway in Pea Ridge National Military Park in northwestern Arkansas. The first major road through northwestern Arkansas, it connected Fayetteville, Arkansas with Springfield, Missouri. The road was part of the major northern route of the Trail of Tears, the forcible remove in the late 1830s of Native Americans from east of the Mississippi River to what is now Oklahoma. The road was also actively used by both Union and Confederate forces during the American Civil War, and was the major route of advance by Confederate forces leading to the Battle of Pea Ridge, whose battlefield is preserved by the park.

The road segment was listed on the National Register of Historic Places in 2005.

See also
National Register of Historic Places listings in Benton County, Arkansas
Springfield to Fayetteville Road-Cross Hollow Segment

References

Roads on the National Register of Historic Places in Arkansas
Buildings and structures completed in 1837
Trail of Tears
National Register of Historic Places in Benton County, Arkansas
1837 establishments in Arkansas
Transportation in Benton County, Arkansas
Native American history of Arkansas